Richelieu Foods is a private label food manufacturing company founded in 1862, headquartered in Wheeling, IL, previously owned by investment group Brynwood Partners and owned from 2010 by investment group Centerview Partners LLC and sold December 2017 to Freiberger USA Inc., Parsippany, New Jersey, USA, a subsidiary of the German Südzucker AG

The company—which produces frozen pizza, salad dressing, sauces, marinades, condiments to be marketed by other companies as their store brand or white label brand—manufactures over 100 million frozen pizzas and more than 25 million finished crusts annually, reporting more than $500 million in yearly sales.

Companies with private label items from Richelieu include Hy-Vee, Aldi, Save-A-Lot, Sam's Club,  Hannaford Brothers Co.,  BJ's Wholesale Club (Earth's Pride brand) and Shaw's Supermarkets (Culinary Circle brand). The company's own brands have included Chef Antonio, Raveena's, Pizza Presto!, Grocer's Garden, Caterer's Collection, Oak Park, and Willow Farms.

With approximately 1000 employees, Richelieu Foods operates four manufacturing facilities in Beaver Dam, Wisconsin (pizza), Wheeling, IL (Pizza)Washington Court House, Ohio (cold press pizza crusts), Grundy Center, Iowa and Elk Grove Village, Illinois (sauces and dressings).

According to Hoover's, Richelieu Foods' average annual revenue per worker is about $900,000.

History
The company was founded in 1862. By 1956, the company operated as Western Dressing Inc. It was sold to an investment group in 1988. The group had the company expand its line of products. In 1994, Richelieu focused on the contract packing and private label areas. The Western Dressing brand was sold and eventually acquired by Unilever with Richelieu Foods packing the dressing until Unilever took it in-house eight years later, marketing it under the Wish Bone brand. In 2003, a Connecticut private equity firm, Brynwood Partners, purchased the company.

In 2006, the company was named Pizza Manufacturer of the Year by Snack Food and Wholesale Bakery magazine. On August 30, 2008, the company acquired the "Sauces and Dressings" division of Sara Lee Foodservice along with the Sara Lee manufacturing facility located in Elk Grove Village, Illinois. In 2010, the company was purchased by Centerview Partners, a private equity firm then by Freiberger USA in 2017.

See also
 List of food companies
 List of frozen food brands

References

Pizza in the United States
Companies based in Massachusetts
Food manufacturers of the United States
Frozen pizza brands
Randolph, Massachusetts
Salad dressings
1862 establishments in Massachusetts
Condiment companies of the United States